Python of Catana was a dramatic poet of the time of Alexander, whom he accompanied into Asia, and whose army he entertained with a satyric drama, called Agen when they were celebrating the Dionysia on the banks of the Hydaspes. The drama was in ridicule of Harpalus and the Athenians; fragments of it are preserved by Athenaeus.  Identification of the poet with Python of Byzantium, the highly regarded orator in the service of Philip II, is unlikely.

See also
Glycera (courtesan)
Harpalus

References
Who's Who in the Age of Alexander the Great by Waldemar Heckel

External links
Deipnosophists of Athenaeus
Αγήν

Poets of Alexander the Great
Sicilian Greeks
Ancient Greek dramatists and playwrights